Huta Stepańska was an ethnic Polish village, located in prewar Kostopol county, Wołyń Voivodeship, in the Second Polish Republic. In 1943, during the Massacres of Poles in Volhynia, it became an important Polish self-defence centre, captured by the UPA between 16 and 18 July 1943. Some 2,000 UIA soldiers, supported by 3,000 local Ukrainian peasants, killed 300 Poles (other sources put number of victims at 600), as they were trying to break out of the encirclement.

History
The village of Huta Stepańska was founded in the end of the 17th century in the scorched areas of the Stepańska Wilderness. Its founders were members of the poor Polish noble family of Sawiccy, who had come there from Zhytomyr. In the registry books in the 19th century, the village is called Majdan, and on maps from before World War I, it is called Majdan Huta. The Geographical Dictionary of the Kingdom of Poland and Other Slavic Countries, issued in 1900 (volume XV, part I), describes the place as follows: “Huta Stepańska, a settlement, located 82 versts from Rivne. 71 houses, 208 inhabitants”.

In 1921, when Volhynia was incorporated into the Second Polish Republic, Huta Stepanska was included in the Kostopol county, Volhynian Voivodeship. According to the 1921 Polish census, it had 97 buildings and 539 inhabitants (489 Roman Catholics, 18 Orthodox, 31 Jews and 1 Protestant). In 1922, a Roman Catholic parish was opened there and after 1930 - a health resort, due to rich resources of salt and therapeutic mud, located there. By 1939, Huta Stepanska developed into a major center of northern Volhynia, with more than 200 houses and almost 1000 inhabitants.

World War II
After combined German and Soviet aggression on Poland, Huta Stepańska, together with whole Volhynian Voivodeship, was annexed by the Soviet Union and was incorporated into the Ukrainian Soviet Socialist Republic. Many inhabitants of this area were deported by the NKVD to Siberia, majority of those deported were Poles (see: Forced settlements in the Soviet Union).

In the summer of 1941, following Operation Barbarossa, Volhynia, together with Huta Stepanska, were incorporated into the Reichskommissariat Ukraine. Local Ukrainians started to organize themselves in paramilitary units, also first troops of the Ukrainian Insurgent Army began to appear in the area.

In late 1942 the UIA started attacking Polish settlements in Volhynia, and in the summer of 1943 the ethnic cleansing became widespread (see: Massacres of Poles in Volhynia). Since Huta Stepańska was a large village, surrounded by a Ukrainian majority, numerous Poles, survivors of the early massacres, gathered there. In the first weeks of summer of 1943, Huta Stepańska became one of the largest centres of Polish defence, with thousands of refugees living there in appalling conditions. Tadeusz Piotrowski estimates that up to 18,000 people found shelter there.

Destruction of the village
Establishment of the defence center, which was commanded by Captain Władysław Kochański, aka Bomba (he had been dropped over Poland in late 1942), and in which there also were Jews, serving in Polish units was soon noticed by the Ukrainians, who decided to destroy it. The attack on Huta Stepanska, preceded by burning fifteen smaller villages in the area, began on July 16, 1943, by troops commanded by Stepan Koval (aka Rubashenko, Burlak), who later said that it was carried out by order of Klym Savur.

Koval stated after the war: 
In the summer of 1943, following orders of Klym Savur, I carried out operation of destruction of Polish population in the Rivne district. A UPA unit under my command destroyed villages of Rafałówka and Huta Stepańska, inhabited by the Poles. According to the order of Oleil, commanders of my battalions - Moroz, Bohdan and Rybak, liquidated Polish colonies and people there, such as Marianówka, Wólka Kotowska - Aleksandria and Zofiówka. We had two days and we managed to keep the schedule.

Huta Stepańska was abandoned and captured by the Ukrainians on July 18, two days after the attack started. Its Polish defenders, realizing that ammunition was in short supply, decided to break out of the encirclement and reach the nearby rail lines. During the evacuation, a panic broke out among Polish civilians, and the Ukrainians took advantage of it, killing from 300 to 600 persons (it is difficult to establish the number of victims). Survivors managed to fight their way through the Ukrainians and reached the railroad junction at the town of Sarny. Most of them were later forcibly taken to Germany, where they had to work for the German war economy as OST-Arbeiters.

Today
Huta Stepańska does not exist any more. All houses inhabited by the Poles were burned to the ground in 1943, and local Ukrainians stole all their possessions, including cattle. What remains is a cross with Polish inscription Jezu ratuj nas (Jesus Save Us, it is a copy of the original, 1943 cross) as well as commemorative stone, placed where once a Roman Catholic church stood, with inscriptions in both Polish and Ukrainian languages.

See also
 Historiography of the Volyn tragedy
 Massacres of Poles in Volhynia
 Przebraze Defence
 Huta Pieniacka massacre
 Janowa Dolina

References

External links
Photo gallery of contemporary Huta Stepanska
Plan of Huta Stepanska, in Polish and Ukrainian

Ruins in Ukraine
World War II crimes in Poland
Massacres in Ukraine
Former populated places in Ukraine
Massacres of Poles in Volhynia
History of Volyn Oblast
1943 in Europe